The Super Quartet is an album by the drummer Louis Hayes, recorded in Italy in 1994 and released on the Dutch Timeless label.

Reception 

The AllMusic review called it "easily one of Louis Hayes' best recordings as a leader," stating that "this quartet session ... almost has the flavor of a typical Art Blakey & the Jazz Messengers album; although there's no brass, the selections and the hard bop arrangements generally fit".

Track listing 
 "Bolivia" (Cedar Walton) – 6:40
 "The Song Is You" (Jerome Kern, Oscar Hammerstein II) – 6:12
 "Up Jumped Spring" (Freddie Hubbard) – 8:17
 "In Your Own Sweet Way"  (Dave Brubeck) – 8:59
 "Chelsea Bridge" (Billy Strayhorn) – 9:41
 "Epistrophy" (Thelonious Monk, Kenny Clarke) – 6:53
 "Blue Lou" (Edgar Sampson, Irving Mills) – 4:56
 "Fee-Fi-Fo-Fum" (Wayne Shorter) – 6:44

Personnel 
Louis Hayes – drums
Javon Jackson – tenor saxophone
Kirk Lightsey – piano
Essiet Essiet – bass

References 

Louis Hayes albums
1994 albums
Timeless Records albums